Arshaq-e Shomali Rural District is in Arshaq District of Meshgin Shahr County, Ardabil province, Iran. At the census of 2006, its population was 5,672 in 1,222 households; there were 4,664 inhabitants in 1,247 households at the following census of 2011; and in the most recent census of 2016, the population of the rural district was 4,237 in 1,355 households. The largest of its 25 villages was Davahchi-ye Olya, with 752 people.

References 

Meshgin Shahr County

Rural Districts of Ardabil Province

Populated places in Ardabil Province

Populated places in Meshgin Shahr County